Donald's Garden is a 1942 animated short film featuring Donald Duck.  It was released by Walt Disney Productions.

Plot
Donald has a garden full of prize-winning melons and a hungry gopher comes along causing a battle to ensue between them.

Voice cast
Clarence Nash as Donald Duck

Home media
The short was released on December 6, 2005 on Walt Disney Treasures: The Chronological Donald, Volume Two: 1942-1946.

References

External links
 
 

1942 films
1942 animated films
1942 short films
1940s Disney animated short films
Donald Duck short films
Films produced by Walt Disney
Films scored by Oliver Wallace
Films about gophers